The World Peace Council (WPC), a pro-Soviet non-governmental organization, has awarded a number of prizes, beginning in 1950.  These have been awarded to individuals, organisations, peoples, and places. Typically, several winners would be voted at one WPC congress; these, or their representative, would receive their prize at a later congress, or from a WPC delegation. Extra prizes were awarded in 1959 and 1964, to mark the WPC's 10th and 15th anniversaries.

The awards include:
International Peace Prize established at the first World Congress of Peace held in April 1949, in Paris. The original 1949 regulations envisaged prizes for art, literature, film, or industrial work which advanced the cause of peace among nations.  In 1951, the WPC recategorised three distinct awards:
International Peace Prize, last awarded in 1957.
Honorary International Peace Prize, for posthumous award.
Medal of Peace, renamed in 1959 the Joliot-Curie Medal of Peace, in honour of Frédéric Joliot-Curie, who led the WPC till his death in 1958. This medal has been awarded in silver, but the highest WPC honour is the gold medal.
Ho Chi Minh Award, a leadership award established in honour of Ho Chi Minh (not to be confused with the Ho Chi Minh Prizes awarded by the Vietnamese government).
Amilcar Cabral Award, established in 1973 in honour of Amílcar Cabral, for contributions to "the struggle against imperialism and colonialism". (The Cape Verde and Guinea-Bissau governments also award Amilcar Cabral prizes.)

The WPC was allied with the Soviet Union and followed its foreign policy line during the Cold War. Some recipients of its prizes have also won the Lenin Peace Prize, a separate prize awarded by a panel appointed by the Soviet government.

List of award winners

In 2002, the WPC denied news reports that it had given a prize to Meles Zenawi.

References
 
 

>

Peace awards
Lists of award winners
World Peace Council